Miss Minoes is a 2001 Dutch film, based on the children's novel Minoes by Annie M.G. Schmidt. The film won the Golden Calves for Best Feature Film and Best Actress (Carice van Houten).

Plot
One night, a cat named Minoes stumbles upon a can of chemical liquid that had been dropped by a truck, and after drinking it transforms into a human woman. As a human, she maintains her feline traits such as her fear of dogs, meowing on the roof with other cats, catching mice, purring, and eating raw fish. She soon meets a journalist named Tibbe, who works for the newspaper of the fictional town of Killendoorn.

Tibbe is very shy, and therefore he finds it quite hard to write good articles. At first, Tibbe does not believe she is a cat in human form, but Minoes happens to know all kinds of interesting news from the town cats, so it doesn't bother him. In exchange for food and shelter, Tibbe allows Minoes to help him with his journalist job by finding interesting news to write about. With the help of the Cat Press Service and all the news the cats bring in, Tibbe soon becomes the journalist with the best articles.

However, there is one important article that Tibbe does not dare to write: an article on the rich Mr. Ellemeet, the chemical factory owner. All town members consider him a very respectable man, and a real animal lover. But all cats know that he is not what he seems. After Minoes finally convinces Tibbe to write and publish the article, the whole town turns their back on him. He loses his job and is almost evicted from his apartment. However, Minoes helps set up a sting in which Ellemeet is filmed shooting at cats and exposed as the cruel villain he is.  In the end, although Minoes has a chance to turn back into a cat by eating a bullfinch (which supposedly eats herbs that can cure many conditions such as that of a cat turning into a human), she decides to remain human and stay with Tibbe, having fallen in love with him. The film's credits reveal that the two got married.

Cast
Carice van Houten as Minoes
Theo Maassen as Tibbe
Sarah Bannier as Bibi
Hans Kesting as Harrie de Haringman
Olga Zuiderhoek as Mrs. Van Dam
Kees Hulst as Mr. Van Dam
Jack Wouterse as Mayor Van Weezel
Pierre Bokma as Mr. Ellemeet

Release
The film was a box office success grossing $4,227,362 in the Netherlands, $111,858 in Germany, $34,164 in Austria, and $389,200 in Norway.  Under the title Miss Minoes, Music Box Films released a dubbed version on 23 December 2011 in New York City and Chicago.

References

External links

 

2000s Dutch-language films
Films based on works by Annie M.G. Schmidt
Films about cats
Films about shapeshifting
Films set in the Netherlands
2001 comedy films
2001 films
Dutch comedy films